Rahal Letterman Lanigan Racing is an auto racing team that has participated in the WeatherTech SportsCar Championship and the IndyCar Series. Headquartered in Brownsburg, Indiana and Hilliard, Ohio, it is co-owned by 1986 Indianapolis 500 winner Bobby Rahal, former television talk show host David Letterman, and businessman Mike Lanigan. The team won the Indianapolis 500 twice in 2004 and 2020 with Buddy Rice and Takuma Sato.

The team was established in 1991 as Rahal/Hogan Racing, became Team Rahal in 1996, and was known as Rahal Letterman Racing from May 2004 until December 2010. Throughout the team's history in IMSA with factory partner BMW, the team has run under the name BMW Team RLL.

CART IndyCar World Series (1991–2003)
Following the 1991 CART season, Bobby Rahal left the Galles-Kraco Racing team. Despite consistent top finishes, Rahal won only two races from 1989 to 1991. Likewise, Danny Sullivan left the Patrick Racing team, following a dismal season with the Alfa Romeo engine. The two drivers essentially swapped rides. Sullivan joined Galles, and Rahal signed with Patrick in September 1991.

By the winter of 1991, however, Patrick Racing started to collapse due to financial and legal issues regarding the Alfa Romeo engine. Ilmor had refused to supply the Chevy/A engine to Patrick due to rumors that one of the Chevrolet Indy car engines had been provided to Alfa-Romeo.

To ensure that Rahal would not be racing an uncompetitive engine in 1992, Patrick sold his assets to Rahal and his new partner Carl Hogan, who was able to secure a supply of Chevy engines. A new team was formed, known as Rahal/Hogan Racing, with key personnel from Patrick Racing, such as team manager Jim McGee, moving over to the new organization.

In 1992, the team won the IndyCar World Series title on their first try, with owner-driver Bobby Rahal driving a Lola T92/00 to 4 victories during the season.

In late 1992, Rahal/Hogan absorbed the Truesports racing team, which Rahal had started his CART career with. The team moved its headquarters from Indianapolis to Hilliard, into the old Truesports facility. Along with the acquisition, they took over the Truesports "All-American" chassis program. Rahal began the 1993 season with an updated version of the Truesports chassis, with the intention of introducing a brand-new Rahal/Hogan chassis later in the year.

A second-place finish at Long Beach offered some promise. The success was short-lived, however, as the chassis proved uncompetitive on ovals. After Rahal failed to qualify at Indianapolis, the team switched to a more conventional Lola, while team driver Mike Groff entered several more races in the R/H-001. Eventually, the team abandoned the chassis project.

In 1994, Rahal/Hogan introduced the Honda HRX Indy V-8 engine to the IndyCar World Series, having performed development testing for the engine throughout the 1993 season, but split with the manufacturer after Rahal finished a disappointing tenth place in the standings.

At Indianapolis, the engine proved uncompetitive, and Rahal risked missing the race for the second year in a row. He borrowed two Penske-Ilmor machines and finished third in the race. In 1996, Carl Hogan left the team and started his racing operation. As a result, the team changed its name to Team Rahal and Hogan started Hogan Racing.

In early 1996, Rahal's longtime friend, and avid race fan, comedian David Letterman, purchased a small share of the team.

Over the next few years, the team would employ Bryan Herta, Max Papis, Kenny Bräck, Jimmy Vasser and Michel Jourdain Jr., getting closest to another title in 2001, when Bräck finished 2nd in points. Rahal himself retired from driving at the end of 1998.

IndyCar Series

Full-time (2004–2008)
The team changed its name again to Rahal Letterman Racing in May 2004. For the 2005 season, RLR's three drivers were Buddy Rice, who won the 2004 Indianapolis 500 while driving for the team, Vítor Meira, who finished second in the 2005 & 2008 Indianapolis 500s, and Danica Patrick, who finished fourth in the 2005 Indianapolis 500 and had the highest finish of any female driver (3 previous) in the history of the Indianapolis 500. Also in the 2005 Indianapolis 500, former team member Kenny Bräck, who was replaced by Rice when he suffered a serious injury in 2003, replaced Rice when he was injured in pre-race practice. Rice was able to recover in time to race in the next IndyCar race.

The Rahal Letterman team had high hopes for 2006. Meira had left the team after the 2005 season to join Panther Racing. He was replaced by Paul Dana who brought an Ethanol sponsorship. The team placed three cars in the top eight for the Toyota Indy 300 during March 25, 2006, qualifying (Patrick third, Rice sixth, Dana ninth), and expected good things to come the next day for the race at Homestead-Miami Speedway.

During the final practice Sunday morning, Vision Racing's Ed Carpenter crashed in turn two and the car slid down the 20-degree banking. Dana, who seemed to not receive the signal from the spotter, ran into the gearbox section of Carpenter's car, sending Dana's car flying on the backstretch. Dana died in the hospital later that afternoon, and the entire team, including Patrick and Rice, withdrew immediately.

Patrick and Rice raced together at St. Petersburg with the third car vacant out of respect, but effective the Bridgestone Indy Japan 300 at Motegi, Japan, Jeff Simmons was added as the team's third driver. In mid-2006 the team switched from Panoz to Dallara chassis. Rice finished 15th in points, Patrick finished 9th, and Simmons finished 16th.

Before the 2006 Monterey Sports Car Championships, Rahal Letterman Racing announced that the team would be fielding a Porsche 997 GT3-RSR in the American Le Mans Series in 2007.

For the 2007 IndyCar Series, RLR fielded two cars, one for Simmons and one for IndyCar veteran Scott Sharp. They were unable to find sponsorship to field a third car for 2004 Indianapolis 500 champion Buddy Rice, who moved to Dreyer & Reinbold Racing. However, after 11 races, released Simmons and picked up former Champ Car driver Ryan Hunter-Reay, who earned a 7th-place finish at the Honda 200. Consistent finishes gave Ryan and the team the Rookie of the Year award despite making only six starts.

In the 2008 IndyCar Series season, RLR fielded just one car driven by Ryan Hunter-Reay. The team scored a win at the IndyCar Series event at Watkins Glen International and Hunter-Reay finished 8th in points. However at the end of the season, the team's ethanol promotion council sponsorship left and it was unable to find full-time sponsorship for 2009.

Part-time (2009–2011)
RLR did not participate full-time in the 2009 season due to a lack of sponsorship. With the sponsorship of DAFCA they participated in the 2009 Indianapolis 500, where driver Oriol Servià, after starting on the ninth row, advanced to tenth place but completed only 98 laps before being forced to quit due to mechanical problems.

In 2010, the team again failed to secure sponsorship for the full season. At the 2010 Indianapolis 500, the team arranged a one-race sponsorship entry for Graham Rahal. Rahal ran in the top ten until a blocking penalty shuffled him back in the standings, and he finished 12th.

In December 2010, Mike Lanigan, former co-owner of Newman-Haas-Lanigan Racing with Carl Haas and actor Paul Newman, became co-owner of what was renamed Rahal Letterman Lanigan Racing.

The team signed Jay Howard to drive the #88 car with Service Central sponsorship for the 2011 Indy 500. Bertrand Baguette also joined the team at the 500. Howard finished 30th after losing a wheel following a pit stop on lap 61, while Baguette would lead 11 laps late in the race before needing to pit for fuel with 3 laps to go. He would finish 7th.

Full-time return (2012–present)

The team returned to full-time IndyCar competition for 2012, running a single Dallara-Honda for Takuma Sato, who achieved two podium finishes at São Paulo and Edmonton. Michel Jourdain Jr. returned to the team in a second car for the Indianapolis 500, where Sato came close to victory, crashing out on the final lap while attempting to pass Dario Franchitti for the lead.

On April 30, 2014, the team made history with Engage Mobile Solutions when four members of the RLL team including driver Graham Rahal and three members of the pit crew wore Google Glass to show an IndyCar Series pit stop from the unique perspective of each person on the racing team.

After rotating through a series of drivers, including Jourdain, Jay Howard, and Mike Conway, Graham Rahal returned to RLL to contest the full 2013 season. Rahal struggled during the 2013 and 2014 seasons with only four top-5 finishes. However, he would have a breakout year in 2015, snapping a six-year winless streak at Auto Club Speedway and dueling Justin Wilson to win at his home track at Mid-Ohio. Rahal would end the 2015 season fourth in points after consecutive bad races at Pocono and Sonoma.

For 2016, the team remained a single-car team but added Indy Lights champion Spencer Pigot to the lineup for three races. Rahal would take a win at Texas Motor Speedway by only .008 of a second.

During 2017 the team would watch another two wins, with Graham Rahal taking back-to-back victories at Detroit.

In 2018, RLL would re-sign Takuma Sato, who had previously won the 2017 Indianapolis 500 for Andretti Autosport. Sato would score his first win for the team at the 2018 Grand Prix of Portland, and would win twice more in the 2019 Indycar season, at Barber Motorsports Park and World Wide Technology Raceway at Gateway respectively. Sato won his second Indianapolis 500 in 2020, his first with RLL Racing. Rahal finished in 3rd position. The team also ran a third car for the first time in a race 2019 Indianapolis 500, with Jordan King finishing in 24th place.

In 2021 RLL again expanded to three cars, with Graham Rahal and Takuma Sato driving two full-time entries while several drivers would drive a third car on a part-time basis. The car would be backed by Hy-Vee, a supermarket chain in the Midwestern United States. Initially, the third car was only scheduled to run the 2021 Indianapolis 500 with Santino Ferrucci behind the wheel but after Ferucci's top ten finish in the 500 Hyvee gave additional sponsorship for the car to run at Detroit, Mid Ohio, and Nashville with Ferucci driving four races. After the Nashville round the team announced the third car would be run at the Big Machine Spiked Coolers Grand Prix and the final three races by different drivers in place of Ferrucci; Danish Formula 2 and current Alpine F1 Academy driver Christian Lundgaard would drive the car at the Big Machine Spiked Coolers Grand Prix on the IMS Road Course with the car backed by MiJack while Oliver Askew would drive the car at Portland, Laguna Seca, and Long Beach backed by Hy-Vee. During the season Ferrucci, Askew, and Lundgaard would all test the third car in shootout style tests to determine who would get the full time drive in the third car in 2022.

For 2022 Takuma Sato would depart the team. The #45 Hy-Vee car would be driven by Jack Harvey, who was signed from Meyer Shank Racing. The team announced on October 20, 2021, that Christian Lundgaard had won the opportunity to drive the #30 car full time and would sign a multi-year deal to compete with RLL full time from 2022 onward.

American Le Mans Series

2007 (Porsche)
In 2007, Rahal Letterman Racing fielded a Porsche 911 GT3 RSR for nine of the twelve races. The team's best results came as a second-place finish at Road America and a third-place finish at Petit Le Mans. The team finished 4th in the GT2 team championship with Tommy Milner and Ralf Kelleners 6th in the driver's championship.

2009–13 (BMW)
The team returned to the series in 2009 with factory support from BMW and thus held dual nationality team licenses (Germany and United States). The team fielded two M3 GT2's, the #90 driven by Joey Hand and Bill Auberlen and the #92 driven by Tommy Milner and Dirk Müller. After a troubled season, the #92 car finished second at the 2009 Petit Le Mans. The team finished 3rd in the team championship with Milner and Müller 4th in the driver's championship.

In 2010, the team continued their relationship with BMW and the American Le Mans Series. Despite only winning one race at Road America, Rahal Letterman Racing won the team championship while Bill Auberlen and Tommy Milner 3rd in the driver's championship.

2011 was an even more successful year for the team. After a one-two finish at the 2011 12 Hours of Sebring the RLL Racing team would win two more races. Despite fierce competition from Corvette, Ferrari, and Porsche, Rahal Letterman Lanigan Racing claimed the GT Teams and Manufacturers championships, While Joey Hand and Dirk Müller won the drivers championship. This was the second team championship for the team with the M3.

In 2012, the team returned to the American Le Mans Series for their 4th year with the BMW M3. After winning their second 12 Hours of Sebring in a row, the team, lacking the speed to the brand new Porsches and Corvettes, would win only one more race at Road America. Despite their deficit in pace, the team finished the season 2nd in the championship with driver Dirk Muller finished 4th, the highest of the BMW team drivers.

Further developing their relationship with BMW Motorsport, the Rahal Letterman Lanigan team campaigned two brand new Z4 GTE cars, replacing the BMW M3 GT2's. Despite being their first season with the car, the team claimed several GT poles, a 1–2 victory at Long Beach, and a win at Lime Rock Park. The team finished the season 2nd in the Teams' and Manufacturers' Championships behind Corvette Racing.

IMSA SportsCar Championship
For 2014, the team continued with its Z4 GTE cars but under the newly formed Tudor United SportsCar Championship (which became the WeatherTech SportsCar Championship starting with the 2016 season). The team would manage four second-place finishes at Daytona and Laguna Seca with the #55 car and Long Beach and Road America for the #56 car. Dirk Müller and teammate John Edwards would finish seventh in the GTLM Drivers' Championship with Bill Auberlen and teammate Andy Priaulx eighth.

For 2015, the team would make several changes to its lineup, this time with ALMS champion Lucas Luhr replacing Müller in the No. 24, and Auberlen being teamed with Dirk Werner in the No. 25. Both teams would take wins during the season, with Edwards/Luhr winning at Laguna Seca, and Auberlen/Werner taking two wins at Long Beach and Austin. Auberlen/Werner would finish second in points to Porsche factory driver Patrick Pilet for the drivers championship. The 24 team also finished 2nd in the teams championship to the Porsche 911 team and BMW finished 2nd to Porsche in manufacturer championship.

For 2016, the team switched to the new BMW M6 GTLM, and the No. 24 team was assigned the Number 100 in celebration of BMW's 100th anniversary. The 25 team finished 7th in the drivers championship and the 100 team in 9th, with neither team winning.

In 2017, the 100 team reverted to the #24, with Martin Tomczyk replacing Luhr as Edwards' teammate, and Alexander Sims as Auberlen's new partner in the 25. The teams returned to their winning ways, with the 25 team (Auberlen/Sims) winning the 6 Hours of the Glen, Petit Le Mans and the Canadian Tire Motorsports Park event and finishing 2nd in the drivers championship. The 24 team (Edwards/Tomczyk) won at Mazda Raceway Laguna Seca, but finished 7th in the championship. The four victories also elevated BMW to 2nd in the 2017 GTLM Manufacturers championship, losing to Chevrolet by just 6 points.

In November 2017, Auberlen was named a BMW Brand Ambassador, and thus stepped down as a full-time driver for 2018. He was replaced by Connor De Phillippi as Sims' full-time partner in the 25 team. Edwards also had a partner change at the 24 team, with Jesse Krohn replacing Tomczyk. RLL also updated to the new BMW M8 GTE. The 25 team (Sims/De Phillippi) won at VIR and Laguna Seca and finished 6th in the 2018 drivers championship, while the 24 team (Edwards/Krohn) finished the season 8th with no race victories.

For 2019, the 24 driver team will remain intact, but Tom Blomqvist was announced to replace Sims as De Phillippi's full-season partner in the 25 team. However, due to delays with his U.S. Visa, Blomqvist had to miss the 2019 24 Hours of Daytona. He was replaced at Daytona by Augusto Farfus, who, along with co-drivers De Phillippi, Colton Herta and Philipp Eng, won the race in the GTLM class. However, the cars scored only three additional podiums combined, so they ranked 6th and 7th in the GTLM drivers standings.

In 2020, the #24 car won the 24 Hours of Daytona and got five additional points, ending second in points. Meanwhile, the #25 car won the 6 Hours of Atlanta plus three more podiums, placing fourth in points.

BMW reduced its budget for the 2021 season, so RLL only entered the four endurance races. In a depleted GTLM field, they scored six pofiums combined but no wins.

IMSA dropped the GTLM class before the 2022 season. RLL joined the new GTD Pro class with the new BMW M4 GT3. The #25 runs full-time, whereas the #24 is an endurance-only entry.

The team was announced to join the IMSA GTP class in 2023 with two LMDh-spec BMW.

Jaguar I-Pace eTrophy

On 28 November 2017, it was announced that the team was to be the first to confirm entry to the I-PACE eTROPHY. The team confirmed that they will run two cars in the series. Katherine Legge and Bryan Sellers are part of the current line-up.

CART/Champ Car drivers

IndyCar drivers

IndyCar driver Paul Dana was fatally injured in final practice for the March 26, 2006 Toyota Indy 300 at Homestead-Miami Speedway, and never officially recorded a start in the IndyCar Series with the team. After sitting out the Honda Grand Prix of St. Petersburg, Jeff Simmons was named to drive the Ethanol #17 entry for the balance of the 2006 season. Midway through the 2007 season, Simmons was released and replaced with Ryan Hunter-Reay.

Racing results

CART FedEx Championship Series results
(key) (results in bold indicate pole position) (results in italics indicate fastest lap)

 The Firestone Firehawk 600 was canceled after qualifying due to excessive g-forces on the drivers. Kenny Bräck was given one bonus point for qualifying on pole.

IndyCar Series results
(key)

* Season still in progress

  Paul Dana was killed during the final practice session of the 2006 Toyota Indy 300.
  Non-points-paying, exhibition race.
  The final race at Las Vegas was canceled due to Dan Wheldon's death.
  Run in conjunction with Scuderia Corsa.

IndyCar wins

Complete Global Rallycross Championship results
(key)

Supercar

Complete Jaguar I-Pace eTrophy results
(key)

Notes
* – Season still in progress.

References

External links
 

 
1991 establishments in Ohio
American auto racing teams
American Le Mans Series teams
Champ Car teams
Companies based in the Columbus, Ohio metropolitan area
David Letterman
Indy Lights teams
IndyCar Series teams
Motor vehicle manufacturers based in Ohio
Global RallyCross Championship teams
WeatherTech SportsCar Championship teams
Atlantic Championship teams
BMW in motorsport
Auto racing teams established in 1991